North Lawrence is a census-designated place in southwestern Lawrence Township, Stark County, Ohio, United States.  It has a post office with the ZIP code 44666. The community is part of the Canton–Massillon Metropolitan Statistical Area. North Lawrence is also the site of the water resort Clay's Park. Its main road is Ohio State Route 93, and it is one mile south of Canal Fulton. 

The local school district is Tuslaw. It has a volleyball, wrestling and cross country program.

Places to visit
Nick-a-Jack Farms - A farm with many fall activities. They provide corn mazes, pumpkin patches, hay rides and a cross country racing course.

Running trail -Trail-head off of Alabama Ave.

North Lawrence Fire Department - Hosts a parade every year on memorial day.

Clay's Park - Camping ground. This is the site of the Cross Country program.

Lawrence Park - Home of the Junior Mustang's Soccer Association. Features a 0.5 Mile Gravel running path with curves and hills. Between the Pavilion and the playground that has swings.

History
North Lawrence was originally called Lawrence, and under the latter name was laid out in 1852. The community derives its name from the township in which it is located. A post office called North Lawrence was established in 1854. North Lawrence includes Bowdil, Ohio.

References

Census-designated places in Stark County, Ohio